The 2012 Morocco Tennis Tour – Casablanca was a professional tennis tournament played on clay courts. It was the second edition of the tournament which was part of the 2012 ATP Challenger Tour. It took place in Casablanca, Morocco between 27 February and 4 March 2012.

ATP entrants

Seeds

 Rankings are as of February 20, 2012.

Other entrants
The following players received wildcards into the singles main draw:
  Yassine Idmbarek
  Mehdi Jdi
  Reda Karakhi
  Younès Rachidi

The following players received entry from the qualifying draw:
  Nicolas Devilder
  Marcin Gawron
  Sergio Gutiérrez Ferrol
  Matwé Middelkoop
  Alexandre Folie (Lucky loser)

Champions

Singles

 Aljaž Bedene def.  Nicolas Devilder, 7–6(8–6), 7–6(7–4)

Doubles

 Walter Trusendi /  Matteo Viola def.  Evgeny Donskoy /  Andrey Kuznetsov, 1–6, 7–6(7–5), [10–3]

External links
Official Website
ITF Search
ATP official site

Morocco Tennis Tour – Casablanca
Casablanca